Jérôme Cellier (born 8 February 1984) is a retired French footballer who played as a defender.

During his career, Cellier represented Chamois Niortais, Clermont Foot, Beauvais and La Roche-sur-Yon, making more than 50 appearances in Ligue 2.

Honours
Chamois Niortais

 Championnat National champions: 2005–06

References
General
 
 
Specific

1984 births
Living people
People from Les Sables-d'Olonne
French footballers
Association football defenders
Chamois Niortais F.C. players
Clermont Foot players
AS Beauvais Oise players
La Roche VF players
Ligue 2 players
Championnat National players
Sportspeople from Vendée
Footballers from Pays de la Loire